Dmitri Pylikhin (born 18 February 1971) is a former Russian football player.

References

1971 births
Living people
Soviet footballers
Russian footballers
FC Tyumen players
Russian Premier League players
Place of birth missing (living people)
Association football midfielders
FC Asmaral Moscow players